Crypturellus is a genus of tinamous containing mostly forest species. However, there are the odd few that are grassland or steppe tinamous. The genus contains 21 species.

Taxonomy
The genus Crypturellus was introduced in 1914 by the British ornithologists Baron Brabourne and Charles Chubb with the Tataupa tinamou as the type species. The genus name combines the Ancient Greek κρυπτός (kruptós) meaning "hidden" with οὐρά (oura) meaning "tail". The -ellus is a diminutive so that the name means "small hidden tail".

Description
Crypturellus members, like other tinamous, have a cryptic color scheme dominated by browns, buffs, yellows, and greys. Unlike the rest of the family, these birds show some sexual dimorphism: the females are more heavily barred than the males and are also a bit brighter and larger.

Range
The majority of species occupy forests or rain forests, preferring lower elevations. They range from Uruguay to Mexico. However, the earliest known occurrence of the genus is a fossil humerus, described as Crypturellus reai, from the Early Miocene Santa Cruz Formation of Patagonia.

Vocalization
Crypturellus are a very loud group of birds with melodious calls. They tend to use lower frequency when they call than other members of the Tinamou. Males and females have different calls and each species also has different calls. Normally each sex will have a long and a short phrase call. The genus can be grouped into two partial groups based on the similarity of their calls.
 Group 1
 Undulated tinamou
 Red-legged tinamou
 Yellow-legged tinamou
 Group 2
 Brown tinamou
 Small-billed tinamou
 Tataupa tinamou

Some, like the slaty-breasted tinamou are quiet and hide during the middle of the day, choosing this time to take naps and conserve energy. The slaty-breasted tinamous also have a unique call amongst themselves, so much so that individual birds can be recognized by their calls. Most members of the genus have a variation in their calls, within the species, based on their geographical location. They also are known to use regular calling sites.

Feeding

Breeding
Courtship technique for the members of Crypturellus consists of the male lowering his breast to the ground, stretching his neck forward and raising his posterior vertically. This will cause the male to appear larger and longer than normal, which not only impresses the female but also benefits the male in that it scares away competitors.

Females outnumber the males with some of the species, such as the variegated tinamou, having a 4:1 female-to-male ratio. They also only have a 2-egg clutch, which would explain why they are one of the species that have multiple clutches.

Once copulation has taken place, the female will choose a nest site that is typically a depression covered with leaves next to a tree trunk, usually between a couple of buttresses. Members of the genus that are savanna style birds such as the small-billed tinamou will instead lay their eggs in a cavity near a clump of grass.  The eggs are oval or elliptical on the smaller birds and near spherical in the larger birds, such as the undulated tinamou and the Brazilian tinamou. The colorings of the eggs are varied, but in general are brightly colored with no splotches or spots; the colors fade over time and usually will change to a less overt color midway through the incubation period. The predominant colors are chocolate or red wine with the eggs of yellow-legged tinamou, undulated tinamou, little tinamou, and red-legged tinamou using different color schemes.

Clutch size can be upwards of 9-16 eggs, however these larger clutches are the products of multiple females. The male will incubate and care for the young. Incubation takes about 16 days. If he dies, the female will take over. When the chicks cross cleared areas, they will run like the chicks of rails. Some members of the genus mature rapidly, like the slaty-breasted tinamou which can gain adult size (not weight) by 20 days.

Relationships
Here is a cladogram of the relationship of species within Crypturellus, from an integumentary phylogenetic study on the Tinamidae, 2013.

Crypturellus parvirostris and Crypturellus tataupa are also the most derived species on a tree of the entire Paleognathae.

Species
The genus contains 21 species:
 Berlepsch's tinamou (Crypturellus berlepschi) – coastal forests of northwestern Colombia and northwestern Ecuador
 Little tinamou (Crypturellus soui) – southern Mexico to northeastern Brazil west to Ecuador and east to French Guiana and also Trinidad
 Cinereous tinamou (Crypturellus cinereus) – southeastern Colombia, southern Venezuela, Guyana, French Guiana, Suriname, northeastern Brazil, and northern Bolivia
 Tepui tinamou (Crypturellus ptaritepui) – the tepuis of southern Venezuela
 Brown tinamou (Crypturellus obsoletus) – northern Venezuela west through Ecuador, Peru, northern and southern Brazil, extreme northeastern Argentina, eastern Bolivia, and Paraguay
 Undulated tinamou (Crypturellus undulatus) – northern and central South America except Suriname and French Guiana
 Pale-browed tinamou (Crypturellus transfasciatus) – coastal forests of Ecuador and extreme northwestern Peru
 Brazilian tinamou (Crypturellus strigulosus) – central Brazil south of the Amazon River, northwestern Bolivia, and eastern Peru
 Grey-legged tinamou (Crypturellus duidae) – the tropical forests of east central Colombia and southern Venezuela
 Red-legged tinamou (Crypturellus erythropus) – from northern Colombia east to French Guiana and south to northern Brazil and also Margarita Island
 Yellow-legged tinamou (Crypturellus noctivagus) – the lowlands of eastern Brazil
 Black-capped tinamou (Crypturellus atrocapillus) – the lowlands of southeastern Peru and northern Bolivia
 Thicket tinamou (Crypturellus cinnamomeus) – from northwestern Costa Rica north to Puebla, Mexico, and all of the Atlantic coastal Mexico and Pacific coastal Mexico excluding Sonora, Mexico
 Slaty-breasted tinamou or Boucard's tinamou (Crypturellus boucardi) – the gulf coastal region of Central America from southeastern Mexico to northeastern Honduras and southeastern Honduras to northern Costa Rica
 Choco tinamou (Crypturellus kerriae) – humid foothills of southeastern Panama to northwestern Colombia
 Variegated tinamou (Crypturellus variegatus) – northern Bolivia, Amazonian Brazil, French Guiana, Guyana, Suriname, Venezuela, and Colombia
 Rusty tinamou or short-billed tinamou (Crypturellus brevirostris) – French Guiana, eastern Peru, and northwestern and northeastern Brazil
 Bartlett's tinamou (Crypturellus bartletti) – western Amazonian Brazil, northern Bolivia, and eastern Peru
 Small-billed tinamou (Crypturellus parvirostris) – from the Amazon Basin in Brazil to northeastern Argentina
 Barred tinamou (Crypturellus casiquiare) – eastern Colombia and southern Venezuela
 Tataupa tinamou (Crypturellus tataupa) – parts of Peru, northeastern Brazil, Paraguay, southern Brazil, eastern Bolivia, and northern Argentina

There is also an extinct species:
†Crypturellus reai Chandler 2012 – dating from the Early-Middle Miocene (Santacrucian; 16.3–17.5 million years ago)

References

Sources 
 
 
 
 

 
Tinamous
Bird genera